Pape Abdou Camara (born 24 September 1991) is a Senegalese footballer who plays for Saudi club Bisha as a defensive midfielder.

Career
Camara began his career in the Academy of Étoile Lusitana. On 17 January 2010, Standard Liège signed the Senegalese midfielder from Etoile Lusitana until June 2011. On 16 May 2010, Standard Liège confirmed he will leave the club in summer 2010 for Sint-Truidense VV. In 2012 he joined Valenciennes.

Armenia
On 29 August 2018, Camara signed for Armenian Premier League club Banants. On 2 August 2019, FC Banants was officially renamed Urartu FC. On 11 December 2019, FC Alashkert announced the signing of Camara from FC Urartu.

Saudi Arabia
On 5 August 2022, Camara joined Saudi Arabian club Al-Qous. On 24 January 2023, Camara joined Bisha.

Career statistics

Club

Honours
Standard Liège
Belgian Cup: 2010–11

References

External links
 Profile at Soccerway
 Profile at Footgoal

1991 births
Living people
Association football midfielders
Senegalese footballers
Senegal international footballers
Senegalese expatriate footballers
Étoile Lusitana players
Standard Liège players
Sint-Truidense V.V. players
Valenciennes FC players
Al-Qous FC players
Bisha FC players
Belgian Pro League players
Ligue 1 players
Saudi Second Division players
Expatriate footballers in Belgium
Expatriate footballers in France
Expatriate footballers in Saudi Arabia
Senegalese expatriate sportspeople in Belgium
Senegalese expatriate sportspeople in France
Senegalese expatriate sportspeople in Saudi Arabia